Ehl or EHL may refer to:

People 
 Klaus Ehl (born 1949), German athlete

Science 
 Elastohydrodynamic Lubrication, a special regime of fluid lubrication

Sport 
 Eastern Hockey League (1933–1973), a defunct American ice hockey league 
 Eastern Hockey League (1978–1981), a defunct American ice hockey league
 Eastern Hockey League (2013–), an American junior ice hockey league
 Emirates Ice Hockey League
 Men's England Hockey League
 Women's England Hockey League
 Euro Hockey League, the top level field hockey competition for European clubs
 European Hockey League, a defunct European ice hockey club competition

Other uses 
 Ehl, Bas-Rhin, France
 Eastern Housing Limited, a Bangladeshi real estate company
 École hôtelière de Lausanne, a Swiss hospitality management school
 El Bolsón Airport, in Argentina
 Equal housing lender
 European Heritage Label
 Evolution of Human Languages, a research projected hosted by the Santa Fe Institute
 Extensor hallucis longus muscle
 "East of Harvey Lock", a location reference on the Gulf Intracoastal Waterway